National Highway 731K, commonly referred to as NH 731K is a national highway in India. It is a secondary route of National Highway 31.  NH-731K runs in the states of Uttar Pradesh and Uttarakhand in India.

Route 
NH731K connects Shahjahanpur, Bisalpur, Barkhera, Pilibhit, Neoria Husainpur, Majhola, Chanda, Mundeli and Khatima in the states of Uttar Pradesh and Uttarakhand.

Junctions  
 
  Terminal near Shahjahanpur.
  near Bisalpur
  near Pilibhit.
  Terminal at Khatima.

See also 
 List of National Highways in India
 List of National Highways in India by state

References

External links 

 NH 731K on OpenStreetMap

National highways in India
National Highways in Uttar Pradesh
National Highways in Uttarakhand